Galina Zakharova may refer to:
Galina Zakharova (runner) (born 1956), Soviet distance runner
Halyna Zakharova (born 1947), Soviet handball player